Georgy Gelashvili (born August 30, 1983) is a Russian professional ice hockey goaltender. He is currently playing for Saryarka Karaganda in the Supreme Hockey League (VHL).

External links

1983 births
Living people
Metallurg Magnitogorsk players
Lokomotiv Yaroslavl players
Sportspeople from Chelyabinsk
Russian people of Georgian descent
Torpedo Nizhny Novgorod players
Traktor Chelyabinsk players
HC Yugra players
Russian ice hockey goaltenders